Le Divan du Monde ('The World Divan') is a converted theatre, now functioning as a concert space, located at 75 rue des Martyrs, in the 18th arrondissement, in the Pigalle neighborhood of Paris.

History 
At the beginning of the 19th century, there was a ballroom called the Saint-Flour Musette. In 1861 it was turned into the Brasserie des Martyrs, which was patronized by Charles Baudelaire, Edgar Degas, and Jules Vallès. This was replaced in 1873 by a café-concert christened the "Divan Japonais" ('Japanese Divan') by its owner Théophile Lefort, who decorated it in Japanese-style. His successor, Jules Sarrazin, had a second room built in the basement called "Temple de la Bonne Humeur" ('Temple of Good Mood').

The cabaret singer Yvette Guilbert became famous there when she appeared in 1891 and Dranem was also a featured artist. The pantomime Le Coucher de la Mariée (The Bride Going to Bed) was performed there in 1894. This included for the first time a "naked" woman (i.e. wearing a somewhat transparent blouse), which scandalized the audience. Toulouse-Lautrec and Adolphe Léon Willette, then Pablo Picasso, were frequent visitors.

In 1901, the Divan became the Théâtre de la Comédie Mondaine. It was later replaced by an erotic theatre.

In 1994, it was reopened as Le Divan du Monde ('The World Divan'), featuring world music concerts of all genres. The Hip Hop dancers Bintou Dembélé performed there in the late 1990s.

In November 2009, it was completely redecorated, and now hosts events from concerts to club nights.

References 
Notes

External links 

 
"Strip Tease 1897" Alice Guy premier strip-tease de l'histoire du cinema "Le coucher d'Yvette" 1897, accessed 8 August 2011

Theatres in Paris
Buildings and structures in the 18th arrondissement of Paris
Music venues in France